Jay Samuel Stowell (1883 - 1966) was an American author associated with the Methodist Episcopal Church. He died in St. Petersburg, Florida.

Bibliography
The Sunday-school Teacher and the Program of Jesus by George Harvey Trull and Jay Samuel Stowell (1915)
Making Missions Real; Demonstrations and Map Talks for Teen Age Groups (1919). .
Home Mission Trails (1920) Abingdon Press. .
A study of Mexicans and Spanish Americans in the United States (1920). .
Story-worship Programs for the Church School Year (1920). .
The Near Side of the Mexican Question (1921). .
Methodist Adventures in Negro Education (1922). .
J. W. Thinks Black (1922). .
The Child and America's Future (1923). .
Methodism's New Frontier (1924). .
Makers of a New World (1926). .
Between the Americas (1930). .

References

American Christian writers
Methodist Episcopal Church

1883 births
1966 deaths